Just Like the First Time is the second studio album by American R&B/Soul singer Freddie Jackson. Released in November 1986, the album had one of the longest record runs at number one on the U.S. R&B Albums chart, as it spent 26 weeks at the top of that chart.  (This longevity gave the album the highest charting position on the Billboard Year-End chart as an R&B Album in 1987.)  It also peaked at number 23 on the Billboard 200. It was certified platinum by the RIAA on January 20, 1987.  The album yielded three number-one singles on the R&B singles chart with "Have You Ever Loved Somebody", "Tasty Love" and "Jam Tonight". A fourth single, "I Don't Want to Lose Your Love", just missed the top spot, peaking at number two. The fifth single, "Look Around", peaked at number 69. A fourth number one single, "A Little Bit More," a duet with Melba Moore was also featured as an eleventh track on some editions of the album.

Track listing
"Tasty Love" (Freddie Jackson, Paul Laurence) – 4:28
"Have You Ever Loved Somebody" (Barry Eastmond, Jolyon Skinner) – 4:37
"Look Around" (Mike Dino Campbell, Janice Dempsey, Paul Laurence) - 5:04
"Jam Tonight" (Freddie Jackson, Paul Laurence) – 4:32
"Just Like the First Time" (Howard King) – 3:58
"I Can't Let You Go" (Garry Glenn, D. Quander) – 4:50
"I Don't Want to Lose Your Love" (Gene McFadden, James McKinney, Linda Vitali, J. Whitehead, John Gary Williams) – 4:38
"Janay" (Gene McFadden, Jimmy McKinney, James McKinney, Linda Vitali) – 4:58
"Still Waiting" (Vaneese Thomas, Wayne Warnecke) – 5:00
"You Are My Love" (Paul Laurence, S. Moore) – 5:25
"A Little Bit More" - 4:54

Personnel and credits 
Musicians

 Freddie Jackson – lead and backing vocals
 Paul Laurence – keyboards (1, 4), all instruments (3), rhythm arrangements (3, 4, 10), vocal arrangements (4), all other instruments (10), orchestral arrangements (10)
 Barry Eastmond – keyboards (2), synthesizers (2), drum programming (2)
 Eric Rehl – synthesizers (2), keyboards (4)
 Clive Smith – Fairlight programming (5)
 Garry Glenn – all other instruments (6)
 James McKinney – keyboards (7, 8), drum programming (7)
 Philip Field – acoustic piano (7)
 Robert Aries – keyboards (9)
 Wayne Warnecke – keyboards (9), drum programming (9)
 Mike Dino Campbell – guitar (1, 7, 8), rhythm arrangements (3)
 Donald Griffin – guitar (6), bass (6)
 Andy Bloch – guitar (9)
 Timmy Allen – bass (1, 8, 10)
 Larry McCray – bass (5) 
 Paul Adamy – bass (9) 
 Leslie Ming – drums (4, 10)
 Sinclair Acey – horn arrangements (5), string arrangements (5)
 Curtis King – backing vocals (2)
 Vaneese Thomas – backing vocals (2, 9)
 Janice Dempsey – backing vocals (3), vocal arrangements (3)
 Yolanda Lee – backing vocals (3, 4)
 Cindy Mizelle – backing vocals (3, 4)
 Audrey Wheeler – backing vocals (3, 4)
 Jenny Peters – backing vocals (7, 8)
 Betsy Bircher – backing vocals (9)
 Francis Johnson – backing vocals (9)
 Carolyn Mitchell – backing vocals (9)
 Melba Moore – duet vocals (11)

Production

 Producers – Paul Laurence (Tracks 1, 3, 4 & 10); Barry Eastmond (Track 2); Chad and Howard King (Track 5); Garry Glenn (Track 6); Gene McFadden (Tracks 7, 8 & 11); Ernie Poccia, Vaneese Thomas and Wayne Warnecke (Track 9).
 Associate Producer on Track 7 – James McKinney
 Executive Producers – Wayne Edwards and Beau Huggins
 Production Coordination – Zack Vaz
 Engineers – Steve Goldman (Tracks 1 & 4); Ron Banks (Tracks 2, 5 & 6-9); Rowe Shamir (Tracks 2, 6, 7 & 8); Joe Marno (Track 4); Richard Kaye (Track 5); Wayne Warnecke (Track 9).
 Second Engineer – Joe Marno (Track 1)
 Art Direction – Roy Korhara
 Design – John O'Brien
 Photography – Carol Weinberg
 Administration – Anne Thomas
 Management – Hush Productions

Charts

Weekly charts

Year-end charts

Singles

Certifications

See also
 List of number-one R&B albums of 1986 (U.S.)
 List of number-one R&B albums of 1987 (U.S.)
 Billboard Year-End

References

External links
Just Like The First Time at Discogs

1986 albums
Freddie Jackson albums
Capitol Records albums